The Cook Blacksmith Shop is a former blacksmith shop in Ponca, Nebraska, United States that today is a museum.

The Cook Blacksmith Shop was built in 1901 by C. O. Cook, who operated his business for over thirty years.  The building is owned by the Ponca Historical Society, which uses the shop as a living history museum. C.O. Cook Blacksmith Shop, with all its original tools and machinery, has been restored and placed in working condition.

It was listed on the National Register of Historic Places in 1974.

It is a one-story structure with a false front.

References

Bibliography

Museums in Dixon County, Nebraska
History museums in Nebraska
Industrial buildings and structures on the National Register of Historic Places in Nebraska
National Register of Historic Places in Dixon County, Nebraska
Blacksmith shops